Philip Ackley Stanton House is a Mission Revival—Spanish Colonial Revival style house in Anaheim, California. It is now within the Fairmont Preparatory Academy.

The Spanish Colonial hacienda-style house built in 1929 by Col. Philip A. Stanton.

Fairmont Middle and High School (later renamed Fairmont Preparatory Academy) opened in September 1994 on the site of the Stanton estate, which includes the Philip Ackley Stanton House.

The building was listed on the National Register of Historic Places on November 21, 1980.

See also
National Register of Historic Places listings in Orange County, California

References

Buildings and structures in Anaheim, California
Tourist attractions in Anaheim, California
Houses in Orange County, California
National Register of Historic Places in Orange County, California
Houses on the National Register of Historic Places in California
Houses completed in 1928
Mission Revival architecture in California
Spanish Colonial Revival architecture in California
History of Anaheim, California
1928 establishments in California